Ernest Lluch is a Trambaix tram stop and a Barcelona Metro station in L'Hospitalet de Llobregat, to the south-west of Barcelona.  The construction works of the new station started in 2007, though they were suspended in 2011 by the Catalan government due to the 2008–15 financial crisis in the country, construction was reactivated in 2019 and inaugurated on July 25, 2021. The metro station is located between the Pubilla Cases and Collblanc stations, and serves as an interchange station to the Trambaix tram system. The station was initially intended to be named Cardenal Reig, a street in the area, or Sant Ramon, the former name of the Trambaix stop.

Rail services

External links
La Vanguardia
Transport.cat
Wikio.es
Huubs
3CAT24.cat

Railway stations in L'Hospitalet de Llobregat
Barcelona Metro line 5 stations
Trambaix stops